Monet is a crater on Mercury. Its name was adopted by the International Astronomical Union (IAU) in 1979. Monet is named for the French artist Claude Monet, who lived from 1840 to 1926.

To the west of Monet is Echegaray crater.  To the northwest is Grieg, and to the southwest is Gluck.  To the east is Sousa crater.

References

Impact craters on Mercury
Claude Monet